Sir Robert Peyton (by 1498 – 1550) of Isleham, Cambridgeshire, was an English politician.

Family
He was born the eldest son of Sir Robert Peyton of Isleham. He married Frances, the daughter and heiress of Francis Haselden of Guilden Morden, Cambridgeshire and Chesterford, Essex by Elizabeth Calthorpe, daughter of Sir William Calthorp KB, and with her had six sons, including the MP Robert Peyton, and 2 daughters.

Career
He was a Member (MP) of the Parliament of England for Cambridgeshire in 1529. He was knighted sometime after 1529.

References

15th-century births
1550 deaths
People from Isleham
English MPs 1529–1536
High Sheriffs of Cambridgeshire and Huntingdonshire